Yuzhno-Sukhokumsk is a town in the Republic of Dagestan, Russia, located on the Sukhaya Kuma River,  northwest of Makhachkala. Population:

History
It was granted urban-type settlement status in 1963 and town status in 1988.

Administrative and municipal status
Within the framework of administrative divisions, it is incorporated as the Town of Yuzhno-Sukhokumsk—an administrative unit with the status equal to that of the districts. As a municipal division, the Town of Yuzhno-Sukhokumsk is incorporated as Yuzhno-Sukhokumsk Urban Okrug.

Demographics
Ethnic groups (2002 census):
Avars (47.9%)
Dargins (18.5%)
Lezgins (10.7%)
Laks (9.0%)
Russians (5.4%)
Kumyks (3.8%)

Climate
Yuzhno-Sukhokumsk has a cold semi-arid climate (Köppen climate classification: BSk).

References

Notes

Sources

External links

Cities and towns in Dagestan
Cities and towns built in the Soviet Union